Jussi Jaakko Saukkonen (until 1948 Johan Jaakoppi; 17 February 1905 – 6 April 1986) was a Finnish politician and a Member of the Parliament of Finland.

He was born in Oulu and became a member of the National Coalition Party (Finland); he was chairman of the party for ten years between 1955 and 1965. He died in Helsinki, aged 81.

References
Parliamentary profile

1905 births
1986 deaths
People from Oulu
People from Oulu Province (Grand Duchy of Finland)
National Coalition Party politicians
Ministers of Education of Finland
Members of the Parliament of Finland (1948–51)
Members of the Parliament of Finland (1958–62)
Members of the Parliament of Finland (1962–66)
University of Helsinki alumni